"Kraina mriy" ("The Land of Dreams") is a song by the Ukrainian rock band Vopli Vidopliassova. Written in 1990, the song was first released on the band's album Hey, O.K that year by Kobza International, but did not gain popularity until its release on the album of the same name in 1994. Since then, it has become an anthem of sorts for VV fans, often closing their concerts.

The song inspired the music festival of the same name in 2004.

History 
The song was written in 1990 by vocalist/accordionist Oleg Skripka. It was first released on the album Hey, O.K by Kobza International that year, and in 1991 on a Kobza compilation.

In 1994, the song became the title track of the band's official debut album, released on SBA/Gala Records in Russia and by the band on cassette.

Since 1998, it is occasionally used to end the band's concerts.

Personnel (1992 recording) 
 Oleg Skripka - vocals, rhythm guitar
 Yuri Zdorenko - lead guitar, backing vocals
 Alexander Pipa - bass, backing vocals
 Sergei Sakhno - drums, backing vocals

Cover versions

In 2011, the band re-sung the song in the Belarusian language as “Краіна мрой” for the Budzma! Tuzin. Perazagruzka-2 compilation album. In 2018 the music portal Tuzin.fm together with Letapis.by selected this self-cover by Vopli Vidopliassova in the top of “60 today’s hits in the Belarusian language,” a list of best songs released since 1988.

References

1990 songs
Ukrainian songs